Stefan Altenburger (Zürich, 1968) is a Swiss visual artist who is best known as musician Golden Boy for his collaborations with Miss Kittin such as the club hit "Rippin Kittin."

Career
A resident of Zurich, Switzerland, Altenburger first found recognition as a visual artist, winning the 1991 Swiss Federal Prize for Design and the 1994 Swiss Federal Prize for the Arts. His gallery shows traveled the world, getting him published in a multitude of European publications. However, in addition to his visual work in design and photography, Altenburger also began producing electronic dance music in the '90s as Klettermax and Golden Boy. Source Records released his self-titled EP as Klettermax in 1998; and his Golden Boy album Or was released in 2001, featuring vocal contributions from Miss Kittin.

Discography

Albums
 Or (with Miss Kittin) (2001)

Singles

Remixes
PeterLicht – ("Heiterkeit") (2001)
Knarf Rellöm & DJ Patex / Saalschutz – ("Little Big City") (2003)

See also
 List of electroclash bands and artists

References

Swiss electronic musicians
1968 births
Swiss dance musicians
Living people
Remixers
Electronic dance music DJs